Louis Joseph César Ducornet (January 10, 1806 in Lille – April 27, 1856 in Paris) was a French painter who painted with his foot. He is known primarily for biblical and historical scenes, as well as portraits.

Biography
Ducornet was born to poor parents at Lille on January 10, 1806. He had a birth defect, now known as phocomelia; having neither arms nor thighs, and only four toes to his right foot. He was unable to walk and had to be carried by his father. However, while still a child, he used to pick up pieces of charcoal from the floor with his toes and the rough sketches he thus made evinced so much promise that he received local instruction in art.

With the help of the municipality of Lille, he was sent to Paris, where he studied under Guillaume Guillon-Lethière, François Louis Joseph Watteau and François Gérard, and for a short period of time he received a government pension from King Louis XVIII. Although his handicap prevented him from entering the competition for the Prix de Rome, he was awarded several medals at the Salon. He even took an occasional student; notably Auguste Allongé. He painted an eleven feet high depiction of Mary Magdalene at the feet of Jesus after the resurrection that was purchased by the French government.

He died in Paris in 1856.

Works
Among his notable paintings are:

Repentance. 1828.
The Parting of Hector and Andromaque. (Lille Museum.)
St. Louis administering Justice. (Lille Museum.)
Death of Mary Magdalen. 1840.
The Repose in Egypt. 1841.
Christ in the Sepulchre. 1843.
Edith finding the body of Harold. 1855.

References

External links

1806 births
1856 deaths
19th-century French painters
French male painters
Artists from Lille
French people with disabilities
French amputees
People without hands
Mouth and foot painting artists
19th-century French male artists